Article One of the United States Constitution gives the Senate the power to "determine the elections, returns, and qualifications" of its own members.  As a result, the Senate has been asked to review the election of one of its members many times.

Election cases

References 

Disputes
Disputes